The Inn Valley Motorway or Inntal Autobahn A12 is an autobahn in the Austrian federal state of Tyrol and part of Euroroutes E45 and E60.

It begins as a continuation of the German Bundesautobahn 93 on the German-Austrian border near Kiefersfelden/Kufstein and runs via Innsbruck (intersection with the Brenner Autobahn A13) to Zams, where it transitions to the S16 Arlberg expressway (Arlberg Schnellstraße). It runs parallel to the River Inn and runs through the Inn Valley fresh air region (Luftsanierungsgebiet).

Importance 
The Kufstein–Innsbruck section, together with the Brenner Autobahn and the German A93 and A8, form the main transport axis from Munich over the Alps to Verona and Modena. In addition the A12 links Tyrol via the so-called German Corner (Deutsches Eck) to Salzburg and the West Autobahn (A1) to Vienna.

The A12 was the first autobahn in Austria that was equipped with an intelligent transportation system. These overhead signs provide information to the motorist on every type of situation (road conditions, traffic, weather, etc.) as well as speed limits.

During summer vacation period 2019, every weekend from mid-June to mid-September, on the section around Innsbruck as well as on A13 (Austria) Brenner Autobahn it is not allowed to leave the motorway in case of traffic jams. This measure is a controversial issue. The most important reason is to protect the local population suffering from the consequences of the denser traffic on rural roads leading parallel to the motorway. This kind of evasion traffic leads to another congestions, noise and pollution. On the other hand, local hotel and restaurant owners are worried about forfeits. Furthermore, whoever wants to avoid the traffic jam will find a pretext for his intention to leave the motorway in case of an inquiry by the Austrian police. However, there is no obligation to show a confirmation for a hotel reservation along the road.

External links 

 Inntal Autobahn auf motorways-exits.com (englisch)

See also 
 Autobahns of Austria

References 

Autobahns in Austria
Kufstein District
Innsbruck-Land District
Transport in Innsbruck
Imst District
Landeck District
Transport in Tyrol (state)